Rundemanen is a mountain in the city of Bergen in Vestland county, Norway. It is considered one of the "seven mountains" which surround the city centre of Bergen.  At  in height, it is the second highest of them all. It's a part of the same massif as the neighboring mountains of Fløyen, Blåmanen, and Ulriken, but not easily visible from the city center since it sits behind Fløyen.

In 1912, a road to the top of the mountain was built in order to construct a large radio station tower.  The tower was closed down in the 1980s. Rundemanen is a well-known hiking area among the citizens of Bergen.

See also
List of mountains of Norway

References

Mountains of Bergen